The Benin Bronzes are a group of several thousand metal plaques and sculptures that decorated the royal palace of the Kingdom of Benin, in what is now Edo State, Nigeria. Collectively, the objects form the best examples of Benin art and were created from the thirteenth century by artists of the Edo people. Apart from the plaques, other sculptures in brass or bronze include portrait heads, jewelry, and smaller pieces.

Many of the dramatic sculptures date to the thirteenth century, and a large part of the collection dates to the fifteenth and sixteenth centuries. It is believed that two "golden ages" in Benin metal workmanship occurred during the reigns of Esigie ( 1550) and of Eresoyen (1735–1750), when their workmanship achieved its highest quality.

Most of the plaques and other objects were taken by British forces during the Benin Expedition of 1897 as imperial control was being consolidated in Southern Nigeria. The objects, work of enslaved hands, were taken as an act of retaliation after the massacre of an unarmed party of British envoys and a large number of their African bearers, and the following British expedition put an end to slave trading in Benin. Two hundred pieces were taken to the British Museum in London, while the rest were taken to other European museums. A large number are held by the British Museum with other notable collections in Germany and the United States.

The Benin Bronzes led to a greater appreciation in Europe of African culture and art. Initially, it appeared incredible to the discoverers that people "supposedly so primitive and savage" were responsible for such highly developed objects. Some even wrongly concluded that Benin knowledge of metallurgy came from the Portuguese traders who were in contact with Benin in the early modern period. The Kingdom of Benin was a hub of African civilisation long before Portuguese traders visited, and it is clear that the bronzes were made in Benin by an indigenous culture centuries before European contact.

While the collection is known as the Benin Bronzes, like most West African "bronzes" the pieces are mostly made of brass of variable composition. There are also pieces made of mixtures of bronze and brass, of wood, of ceramic, and of ivory, among other materials. The metal pieces were made using lost-wax casting and are considered among the best sculptures made using this technique.

Since November 2022, information on the Benin Bronzes and other artifacts from the Kingdom of Benin can be accessed through the online platform Digital Benin.

On 29 November 2022, it was announced that the Horniman Museum in Forest Hill, London had signed its Benin Bronzes back to Nigeria. The formal signing ceremony took place on the evening of 28 November 2022 in front of Nigerian royalty and other dignitaries.

History

Social context and creation 

Many of the dramatic sculptures date to the thirteenth century, and a large part of the collection dates to the fifteenth and sixteenth centuries. It is believed that two "golden ages" in Benin metal workmanship occurred during the reigns of Esigie (fl. 1550) and of Eresoyen (1735–1750), when their workmanship achieved its highest quality.

The Kingdom of Benin, which occupied southern parts of present-day Nigeria between the fourteenth and nineteenth centuries, was rich in sculptures of diverse materials, such as iron, bronze, wood, ivory and terra cotta.  The Oba's palace in Benin City, the site of production for the royal ancestral altars, also was the backdrop for an elaborate court ceremonial life in which the Oba of Benin, his warriors, chiefs and titleholders, priests, members of the palace societies and their constituent guilds, foreign merchants and mercenaries, and numerous retainers and attendants all took part.  The palace, a vast sprawling agglomeration of buildings and courtyards, was the setting for hundreds of rectangular brass plaques whose relief images portray the persons and events that animated the court.

Bronze and ivory objects had a variety of functions in the ritual and courtly life of the Kingdom of Benin. They were used principally to decorate the royal palace, which contained many bronze works. They were hung on the pillars of the palace by nails punched through them. As a courtly art, their principal objective was to glorify the Oba, the divine king, and the history of his imperial power or to honour the Iyoba of Benin (the queen mother). Art in the Kingdom of Benin took many forms, of which bronze and brass reliefs and the heads of kings and queen mothers are the best known. Bronze receptacles, bells, ornaments, jewellery, and ritual objects also possessed aesthetic qualities and originality, demonstrating the skills of their makers, although they are often eclipsed by figurative works in bronze and ivory carvings.

In tropical Africa the technique of lost-wax casting was developed early, as the works from Benin show. When a king died, his successor would order that a bronze head be made of his predecessor. Approximately 170 of these sculptures exist, and the oldest date from the twelfth century.  The oba, or king, monopolized the materials that were most difficult to obtain, such as gold, elephant tusks, and bronze.  These kings made possible the creation of the splendid Benin bronzes; thus, the royal courts contributed substantially to the development of sub-Saharan art.  In 1939, heads very similar to those of the Kingdom of Benin were discovered in Ife, the holy city of the Yoruba, which dated to the fourteenth and fifteenth centuries.  This discovery supported an earlier tradition holding that it was artists from Ife who had taught Benin the techniques of bronze metalworking.  Recognition of the antiquity of the technology in Benin advanced when these sculptures were dated definitively to that era.

European interest and the Benin Expedition of 1897 

Few examples of African art had been collected by Europeans prior to the nineteenth century, though European printed books already included images of Benin City and of the oba's palace from the early 1600s onward. Only at the beginning of the nineteenth century, when colonization and missionary activity began, did larger numbers of African works begin to be taken to Europe, where they were described as simple curiosities of "pagan" cults.  This attitude changed after the Benin Expedition of 1897.

In 1897, the vice consul general James Robert Phillips, of the Niger Coast Protectorate, together with six other British officials, two businessmen, translators, and 215 porters, set off toward Benin from the small port of Sapele, Nigeria, The true intention of the visit is disputed. The delegation's stated aim was to negotiate with the Oba of Benin, while some historians contend that it was a reconnaissance mission disguised as a peaceful diplomatic delegation with the goal of ultimately overthrowing the king (Oba) of Benin. Although they had given word of their intended visit, they were later informed that their journey must be delayed, because no foreigner could enter the city while rituals were being conducted; however, the travellers ignored the warning and continued on their expedition. They were ambushed at the south of the city by Oba warriors, and only two Europeans survived the ensuing massacre.

News of the incident reached London eight days later and a naval punitive expedition was organized immediately, which was to be directed by Admiral Harry Rawson. British forces sacked and destroyed Benin City. Following the attack, the victors took the works of art decorating the Royal Palace and the residences of the nobility, which had been accumulated over many centuries.  According to the official account of this event written by the British, the attack was warranted because the local people had ambushed a peaceful mission, and because the expedition liberated the population from a reign of terror. Further, these objects were deemed "spoils of war", meaning that their rightful ownership was up for debate as soon as the attack began. This ambiguity surrounding the objects' ownership has made it difficult for the Benin Kingdom (present day Nigeria) to reclaim their property.

The works taken by the British were a treasure hoard of bronze and ivory sculptures, including king heads, queen mother heads, leopard figurines, bells, and a great number of images sculpted in high relief, all of which were executed with a mastery of lost-wax casting. In 1910, German researcher Leo Frobenius carried out an expedition to Africa with the aim of collecting works of African art for museums in his country. Today perhaps as few as fifty pieces remain in Nigeria although approximately 2,400 pieces are held in European and American collections.

Division among museums 

The Benin Bronzes that were part of the booty of the punitive expedition of 1897 had different destinations: one portion ended up in the private collections of various British officials; the Foreign and Commonwealth Office sold a large number, which later ended up in various European museums, mainly in Germany, and in American museums. The high quality of the pieces was reflected in the high prices they fetched on the market. The Foreign Office gave a large quantity of bronze wall plaques to the British Museum; these plaques illustrated the history of the Benin Kingdom in the fifteenth and sixteenth century.

Subsequent sales, restitutions and repatriations 
The two largest collections of Benin Bronzes are located in the Ethnological Museum of Berlin and in the British Museum in London, while the third largest collection is located in several museums in Nigeria (principally the Nigerian National Museum in Lagos).

Since gaining independence in 1960, Nigeria has sought the return of the bronzes on several occasions. There has also been extensive debate over the location of the bronzes being distant from their place of origin. Often, their return has been considered emblematic of the repatriation of the African continent. The artefacts have become a test case in the international debate over restitution, comparable to that of the Elgin Marbles.

The British Museum sold more than 30 Benin Bronzes to the Nigerian government between 1950 and 1972. In 1950, the museum's curator Hermann Braunholtz declared that, although made individually, of the 203 plaques acquired by the Museum in 1898, 30 were duplicates; because they were identical representations, he determined that they were superfluous for the museum and were sold. The sales stopped in 1972 and the museum's African art specialist said that they regretted the sales. A newspaper publication revealed that in 1953, Sotheby's sold a Benin Bronze head for £5,500 when the previous record sale was £780. In 1968, Christies sold for £21,000 a Benin Head that was discovered by an officer around his neighbour's greenhouse. In 1984, Sotheby's auctioned a plaque depicting a musician; its value was estimated at between £25,000 and £35,000 in the auction catalogue. In 2015, a Benin Bronze head was sold to a private collector for a record fee of £10 million.

In 2018, an agreement was made between the Benin Dialogue Group (BDG) and the government in London to return Benin Bronzes that will be used to form a temporary exhibition at the New Benin Royal Museum in Edo State. The group comprises representatives of several international museums, the Royal Court of Benin, Edo State Government and the Nigerian National Commission for Museums and Monuments. In 2015, Mark Walker returned some Benin Bronzes that were taken by his grandfather during the siege on Benin Kingdom, and he was received by Prince Edun Akenzua in Benin City.

In 2020, Nigeria took receipt of a terracotta head that was believed to be around 600 years old, which had been smuggled out of Nigeria.

The University of Aberdeen agreed in March 2021 to return a bronze head of an oba, that had been purchased at an auction in 1957.

In April 2021, the German government declared the restitution of "looted" Benin bronzes in Germany's public collections by 2022. Hartmut Dorgerloh, the director of the Humboldt Forum, which incorporates the Ethnological Museum of Berlin, said at a press event that exhibiting the Benin bronzes in the new museum complex in Berlin as earlier planned is "now not imaginable". Also in April 2021, the Church of England promised to return two Benin bronzes that were given as gifts to the then Archbishop of Canterbury Robert Runcie almost 40 years ago. These bronzes were meant to join the collection of the future Benin Royal Museum. In the same month, the Horniman Museum in South London said it was considering legal advice in terms of repatriation and restitution of 49 works from Benin City including 15 brass plaques, weapons and jewellery in its possession.

In response to the British Museum's continued refusal to return looted Benin bronzes, the Iyase (traditional prime minister) of Benin Kingdom unveiled the largest bronze plaque to date on 30 July 2021. The plaque contains over 2 tons of brass and was created by one of the grandsons of the current Iyase of Benin Kingdom, Lukas Osarobo Zeickner-Okoro. It is titled 'The Return of Oba Ewuare' to symbolise the Benin belief in reincarnation and a restart of the Benin Bronze Age in the reign of the current Oba of Benin, Ewuare II. It therefore honours the Oba and was even offered in exchange for the bronzes held by the British Museum.

In October 2021, Jesus College, Cambridge, announced that it would be repatriating a sculpture of a cockerel, known as Okukor, to Nigeria, on the 27 October, after the student body brought to light its historical significance as a looted artefact. The statue had previously been removed from display in 2016, after student calls for the statue to be repatriated; following investigation by the college's Legacy of Slavery Working Party (LSWP), it was ascertained that the statue had been directly taken from the court of Benin, and had been gifted to the college by the father of a student in 1905. In February 2022, two Benin bronzes, the bust of a Head of an Oba and the bronze cockerel Okukor, that had been returned by the University of Aberdeen and Jesus College, Cambridge, were received at the royal palace in Benin City by the Oba of Benin, Ewuare II. In December 2022, the University of Cambridge legally transferred ownership of more than 100 Benin artefacts from its Museum of Archaeology and Anthropology to the National Commission of Museums and Monuments (NCMM) of Nigeria. A museum spokesperson declared that some of the pieces were to remain in Cambridge “on extended loan” to ensure that “this west African civilisation continues to be represented in the museum’s displays, and in teaching for school groups."

In November 2021, the Metropolitan Museum of Art transferred two sixteenth-century Bronze plaques, a Warrior Chief and Junior Court Official to the National Commission for Museums and Monuments. This transfer is not to be confused as a response to repatriation requests, as the Institution owns a collection of about 160 Benin Bronzes. Instead, the museum describes this transfer as a return of plaques that were stolen from the National Museum in Lagos in the 1950s.

In January 2022, the Great North Museum: Hancock in Newcastle, England, agreed to return a Benin Bronze stave to Nigeria. In March 2022, the Smithsonian Institution announced that 39 bronzes in its National Museum of African Art would be repatriated. The bronzes are meant to be on display at the future National Museum of Benin City.

On 1 July 2022, Germany announced the immediate ownership transfer of 1,100 artefacts held by the Linden Museum in Stuttgart, Berlin's Humboldt Forum, the Cologne Rautenstrauch-Joest Museum, Hamburg's Museum am Rothenbaum and the State Ethnographic Collections of Saxony to Nigeria. The physical return of each item will be negotiated between the German museums and the Nigerian government and some of the objects could remain in display in Germany under custody agreements. Hermann Parzinger, the head of the Prussian Cultural Heritage Foundation, an authority that oversees many of Berlin's museums, said a “representative collection of objects” would remain in the German capital on a long-term loan.

On 28 November 2022, the Horniman Museum in London held an official ceremony, unconditionally transferring ownership of its Benin Bronzes back to Nigeria.

Opposition 
In August 2022, an African-American slavery reparations activist group in the US, called the Restitution Study Group, petitioned against the United Kingdom's Charity Commission repatriating the Benin Bronzes to Nigeria. The group argued that in the country's history, African people had been complicit in selling captives into the Atlantic slave trade. Instead, the group suggested that descendants of enslaved Africans should have co-ownership over the Benin Bronzes in Western museums.

Digital Benin online platform 
In November 2022, ARTnews magazine and other media reported that the Digital Benin online database had been created by a number of museums, including both experts from Nigeria (National Museum Lagos and Benin City National Museum) as well as from other African and Western institutions. Digital Benin lists 131 institutions from 20 countries with Benin cultural heritage in their collections. This new online platform allows visitors to learn about the specifications, location and provenance of more than 5,000 African artifacts, including maps, high-resolution images, and the title of the works in English and Edo languages.

The works 

The Benin Bronzes are more naturalistic than most African art of the period. The bronze surfaces are designed to highlight contrasts between light and metal. The features of many of the heads are exaggerated from natural proportions, with large ears, noses, and lips, which are shaped with great care. The most notable aspect of the works is the high level of metal working skill at lost-wax casting. The descendants of these artisans still revere Igue-Igha, as the person who introduced the art of casting to the Kingdom of Benin.

Another important aspect of the works is their exclusivity: property was reserved only for certain social classes, reflecting the strict hierarchical structure of society in the Kingdom of Benin. In general, only the king could own objects made of bronze and ivory, however, he could allow high-ranking individuals to use such items, such as hanging masks and cuffs made of bronze and ivory. Coral was also a royal material. Coral neck rings were a symbol of nobility and use was granted specifically by the Oba.

Themes 

The rectangular plaques exist in two formats. In one, the long vertical sides are turned back, creating a small edge that is decorated with an incised guilloché pattern. In the other format, which is much narrower, the turned-back edges are missing and the design of the plaque background ends abruptly, as if cut off. These variations probably reflect the size and shape of the palace pillars and the arrangement of the plaques on them. The plaques are generally about 1/8 inch (3.175 mm) thick.

The backgrounds on the front of most of the plaques are incised with foliate patterns bearing one to four leaves, which is referred to as ebe-ame, or the "river leaf" design. The leaves were used in healing rites by priestesses of Olokun, the god of the sea.

Some of the reliefs represent important battles of the sixteenth-century wars of expansion; however, the majority depict dignitaries wearing ceremonial dress. Most of the plaques portray static figures, either alone, in pairs, or in small groups arranged hierarchically around a central figure. Many of the figures depicted in the plaques may be identified only through their clothing and emblems, which indicated their rank and function in the court, but not their individual identities. Although there have been attempts to link some of the depictions with historical figures, these identifications have been speculative and unverified. In certain cases, the lack of information even extends to the functional roles of some figures, which cannot conclusively be determined.

The bronze heads were reserved for ancestral altars. They were also used as a base for engraved elephant tusks, which were placed in openings in the heads. The commemorative heads of the king or the queen mother were not individual portraits, although they show a stylized naturalism. Instead, they are archetypical depictions; the style of their design changed over the centuries, which also occurred with the insignia of the depicted royalty. The elephant tusks with decorative carvings, which may have begun being used as a decorative element in the eighteenth century, show distinct scenes from the reign of a deceased king.

As a prerequisite for royal succession, each new Oba had to install an altar in honor of his predecessor. According to popular belief, a person's head was the receptacle of the supernatural guide for rational behavior.  The head of an Oba was especially sacred, since the survival, security, and prosperity of all Edo citizens and their families, depended on his wisdom.  In the annual festivals to reinforce the mystical power of the Oba, the king made ritual offerings in these sanctuaries, which were considered essential for the continuation of his reign. The stylistic variation of these bronze heads is such an important characteristic of Beninese art that it constitutes the primary scientific basis for establishing a chronology.

The leopard is a motif that occurs throughout many of the Benin Bronzes, because it is the animal which symbolizes the Oba. Another recurring motif is the royal triad: the Oba in the centre, flanked by two assistants, highlighting the support of those who the king trusted in order to govern.

According to some sources, the Benin artists may have been inspired by items brought during the arrival of the Portuguese, including European illuminated books, small ivory caskets with carved lids from India, and Indian miniature paintings. The quatrefoil "river leaves" might have originated from European or Islamic art, but by contrast, Babatunde Lawal cites examples of relief carving in southern Nigerian art to support his theory that the plaques are indigenous to Benin.

British archaeologist and anthropologist Dan Hicks discussed the looting of the Benin Bronzes and their current presence within museums around the world. In his book he expressed the view that the looting of the Benin Bronzes are not an 'historical incident of reception' but an 'enduring brutality'. It was also noted that a total figure of looted artefacts from Benin was up to 10,000 bronzes, ivories and other objects. Hicks notes that many of the looted Benin artefacts are in regional and university museums within the UK rather than the more well-known collections such as the British Museum, Royal Collection and the Victoria and Albert Museum.

Technique 

Although the works generally are called the Benin Bronzes, they are made of different materials. Some are made of brass, which analysis has shown to be an alloy of copper, zinc and lead in various proportions. Others are non-metallic, made of wood, ceramic, ivory, leather or cloth.

The wooden objects are made in a complex process. It starts with a tree trunk or branch and is carved directly. The artist obtains the final form of the work from a block of wood. Since it was customary to use freshly cut wood in carvings, once the piece was finalized the surface was charred to prevent cracking during drying. This also allowed for polychromatic artworks, which were achieved using knife cuts and applications of natural pigments made with vegetable oil or palm oil. This type of grease, which was made near smoke from homes, allowed the wooden sculptures to acquire a patina that resembles rusty metal.

The figures depicted in the bronzes were cast in relief with details incised in the wax model. Artists working in bronze were organized into a type of guild under royal decree and lived in a special area of the palace under the direct control of the Oba. The works made using lost-wax casting required great specialisation. Their quality was superior when the king was especially powerful, allowing him to employ a great number of specialists.

Although the oldest examples of similar Benin metal work in bronze date from the twelfth century, according to tradition, the lost-wax casting technique was introduced to Benin by the son of the Oni, or sovereign of Ife. Their tradition holds that he taught the Benin metal workers the art of casting bronze using lost-wax techniques during the thirteenth century. These Benin artisans refined that technique until they were able to cast plaques only an eighth-of-an-inch thick, surpassing the art as practiced by Renaissance masters in Europe.

Reception 

One sixteenth-century bronze, depicting the Oba with Europeans, was featured in A History of the World in 100 Objects, a series of radio programmes that started in 2010 as a collaboration between the BBC and the British Museum; it was also published as a book.

See also
 Art of the Kingdom of Benin
 Edo Museum of West African Art
 Benin Dialogue Group
 Looted art
 Manilla (money)
 Okukor, a bronze formerly at Jesus College, Cambridge

References

Notes

Footnotes

Bibliography 
 
 
 
 
 
 
 
 
 
 Lundén, Staffan (2016). Displaying Loot. The Benin objects and the British Museum. Gotark Series B, Göteborgs Universitet.

External links 

 Digital Benin online platform
 Benin Plaques, Museum number Af1898,0115.23, Collection Online, British Museum

Benin art
African sculptures in the British Museum
Benin City
Bronze sculptures
Art and cultural repatriation
Nigeria–United Kingdom relations
Nigeria–United States relations
Germany–Nigeria relations
Benin Court Art